Redruth School is a secondary school in Redruth, Cornwall, England, for pupils aged 11 to 16. It was formed in 1976 by the merger of Redruth Grammar School and Tolgus Secondary School.

The sports fields of the school are also used as a venue for the Westward League Cross Country running competitions once a year.The school has extensive sports facilities, such as a swimming pool, a fitness suite and a gymnasium.

Craig Martin, the former headteacher of the school, left the position in the summer term of 2022. He was headteacher for twelve years, joining sometime in 2010. The schools fitness suite has been renamed in his honor.

Notable former pupils
 Aphex Twin, musician, attended the school, and named a song on the re-release of his Surfing on Sine Waves album after it.
 Helen Blaby, BBC reporter and newspaper columnist
Rory McGrath, British comedian, television personality, and writer

References 

Secondary schools in Cornwall
Foundation schools in Cornwall
Redruth